The AHFC Royals are an American soccer club competing in the USL League Two. The Royals also field a team in the Women's Premier Soccer League.

Year-by-year

Honors
League Championships
USL League Two
Winners:
Runners-up:
WPSL
Winners:
Runners-up:
Division Championships
Men`s USL League Two (0): none
Women`s WPSL (2): 2021, 2022

References

USL League Two teams
Soccer clubs in Houston
2017 establishments in Texas
Association football clubs established in 2017